A thermal interface material (shortened to TIM) is any material that is inserted between two components in order to enhance the thermal coupling between them. A common use is heat dissipation, in which the TIM is inserted between a heat-producing device (e.g. an integrated circuit) and a heat-dissipating device (e.g. a heat sink). At each interface, a thermal boundary resistance exists to impede heat dissipation. In addition, the electronic performance and device lifetime can degrade dramatically under continuous overheating and large thermal stress at the interfaces. Therefore, for the last several decades, there have been intensive efforts in developing various TIMs with the aim of minimizing the thermal boundary resistance between layers and enhancing thermal management performance, as well as tackling application requirements such as low thermal stress between materials of different thermal expansion coefficients, low elastic modulus or viscosity, flexibility, and reusability:

Thermal paste: Mostly used in the electronics industry, it provides a very thin bond line and therefore a very small thermal resistance. It has no mechanical strength (other than the surface tension of the paste and the resulting adhesive effect) and will need an external mechanical fixation mechanism. Because it does not cure, it is used only where the material can be contained or in thin application where the viscosity of the paste will allow it to stay in position during use.
Thermal adhesive: As with the thermal paste, it provides a very thin bond line, but provides some additional mechanical strength to the bond after curing. Thermal glue allows thicker bond line than the thermal paste, as it cures.
Thermal gap filler: This could be described as "curing thermal paste" or "non-adhesive thermal glue". It provides thicker bond lines than the thermal paste as it cures while still allowing an easy disassembly thanks to limited adhesiveness.
Thermally conductive pad: As opposed to previous TIM, a thermal pad comes not in liquid or paste form, but in a solid state (albeit often soft). Mostly made of silicone or silicone-like material, it has the advantage of being easy to apply. It provides thicker bond lines, but will usually need higher force to press the heat sink onto the heat source so that the thermal pad conforms to the bonded surfaces.
Thermal tape: This adheres to the bonded surfaces, requires no curing time and is easy to apply. It is essentially a thermal pad with adhesive properties.
Phase-change materials (PCM): Naturally sticky materials, used in place of thermal pastes. Its application is similar to solid pads. After achieving a melting point of 55–60 degrees, it changes to a half-liquid status and fills all gaps between the heat source and the heat sink.
Metal thermal interface materials (metal TIMs): Metallic materials offer substantially higher thermal conductivity as well as the lowest thermal interface resistance. This high conductivity translates to less sensitivity to bondline thicknesses and coplanarity issues than polymeric TIMs.

See also
Heat sink
Heat spreader

References

Computer hardware cooling
Heat exchangers
Heat transfer
Materials science